The Nepal cricket team toured the United Arab Emirates in January and February 2019 to play three One Day Internationals (ODIs) and three Twenty20 International (T20I) matches, with all the fixtures taking place at the ICC Academy Ground in Dubai.

Nepal played their first ever ODI series against the Netherlands in August 2018, drawing the two-match series 1–1. Nepal and the United Arab Emirates also played an ODI match against each other later the same month, in the 2018 Asia Cup Qualifier, with the UAE winning by 78 runs. On 1 January 2019, Nepal's head coach Jagat Tamata and captain Paras Khadka named a twenty-man preliminary squad for the tour.

The Emirates Cricket Board (ECB) announced their squad without their regular captain Rohan Mustafa, as he was suspended for breaching the ECB's Player's Code of Conduct. Mohammad Naveed replaced him as the captain of the team for the series.

Nepal won the ODI series 2–1, their first-ever ODI series win. In the third match, Nepal's captain, Paras Khadka, scored the first century by a batsman for Nepal in an ODI match. Nepal also won the T20I series 2–1.

Squads

ODI series

1st ODI

2nd ODI

3rd ODI

T20I series

1st T20I

2nd T20I

3rd T20I

References

External links
 Series home at ESPN Cricinfo

2019 in Emirati cricket
2019 in Nepalese cricket
International cricket competitions in 2018–19
International cricket tours of the United Arab Emirates
Nepalese cricket tours abroad